This is the Group G series List of the United States military vehicles by (Ordnance) supply catalog designation, — one of the alpha-numeric "Standard Nomenclature Lists" (SNL) that were part of the overall List of the United States Army weapons by supply catalog designation, a Supply Catalog that was used by the United States Army Ordnance Department / Ordnance Corps as part of the Ordnance Provision System, from about the mid-1920s to about 1958.

In this, the Group G series numbers were designated to represent "Tank / Automotive materiel" – the various military vehicles and directly related materiel. These designations represent vehicles, modules, parts, and catalogs for supply and repair purposes. There can be numerous volumes, changes, and updates under each designation. The Group G list itself is also included, being numbered G-1.

Generally, the G-series codes tended to group together "families" of vehicles that were similar in terms of their engine, transmission, drive train, and chassis, but have external differences. The body style and function of the vehicles within the same G-number may vary greatly.

Group G Scope
The  sums up in detail, the coverage of Group G as:

"Armored, half-track, and scout cars; gun, howitzer, and mortar motor carriages; cargo, mortar, personnel, half-track and universal carriers; armored amphibian, light, medium, and heavy tanks; light, medium, heavy, crane and amphibian/track-type tractors; wheeled tractors; armored, bomb, heavy-duty and tractor crane trailers; tank recovery and tank transporter trailer trucks, with their parts and equipment. Ordnance maintenance bomb service, emergency repair, machine shop and repair trucks, with their parts and equipment. Prime movers, passenger cars, fuel tank trucks, fuel and water tank trailers, and semitrailers; trucks, with stake, platform, dump, and special bodies; amphibian cargo and personnel trucks; motorcycles and side cars."

G1 to G99
 G-1
 Major Items and Major Combinations of Group G (catalog). Known editions are:
 1 April 1954
 4 April 1949
 26 April 1944
 1 July 1943
 7 December 1941?
 1 July 1930

 G-2
 M1917 artillery tractor, 5-Ton, Holt
 G-3
 M1917 artillery tractor, 10-Ton, Holt
 G-4
 M1918 Trailer 3" field gun, 3-inch M1902 field gun
 M1918A1, W/ 36x7 inch tires 
 M1918A2, W/ sideboards, and 36x6 inch tires
 M1918A3, W/ sideboards and 36x7 inch tires
 M1918A4, W/ heavy ramps, and 36x7 inch tires, (for tractors)
 G-5
 M1918 trailer, 10-Ton, tank hauler
 G-6
 M1918 Shop Trailer, 4-Ton

 G-7
 M2 light tractor, Caterpillar Inc. model 20 
 G-8
 M1918 Body Repair (3-ton FWD chassis)
 G-9
 items common to two or more group G items
 G-10
 M1918 light repair truck, Dodge
 G-11
 M1918 anti-aircraft gun trailer, 1½-Ton
 G-12
 M1917 Tank, Renault FT
 W/ 37 mm gun turret
 W/ B.T.M. gun turret
 W/ Radio turret (SCR-78)
 G-13
 MK-VIII Tank
 G-14
 M1 cross country car
 G-15
 M1 Light Ordnance Tractor Caterpillar Inc.
 G-16
 M1 light shop truck, (Machine)
 G-17
 Trailer, Maintenance, Heavy ord. M1918
 G-18
 M1918 small arms repair truck
 G-19
 interchangeability for special tools
 G-20
 Truck, maintenance, heavy ord. M1918 (3-ton FWD chassis)
 air compressor
 office and headquarters
 power saw
 shop equipment and spare parts
 tool room

 G-21
 M1 medium tractor, Caterpillar Inc., model 30
 G-22
 M1 heavy, Ordnance tractor, Caterpillar Inc., model 60 Caterpillar 60
 G-23
 M1 rail tractor, 4-Ton (FWD truck with rail equipment) in 3 gauges
 36-inch for Hawaiian Dept. (narrow gauge)
 4' 8 1/2 " for CONUS. (standard gauge)
 60-Inch for Dept. of Panama (broad gauge)
 G-24
 M2 rail tractor, 8-Ton (FWD truck with rail equipment) in 3 gauges
 36-inch for Hawaiian Dept. (narrow gauge)
 4' 8 1/2 " for CONUS. (standard gauge)
 60-Inch for Dept. of Panama (broad gauge)
 G-25
 rail tractor, w/ track-laying adapters, Fordson

 G-26
 M1 instrument trailer, 6-Ton
 G-27

 Tools, maintenance, for repair of group G materiel.
 S1. Tool sets (special), automotive and semi automotive. (superseded by ORD 6, SNL J-16)(per 1955 index)
 S2. Tool sets (common), specialists and organizational. (superseded by group J SNLs)(per 1955 index)

 G-28
 M1 prime mover, 8-ton, anti-aircraft gun (T4) (Corbitt), (1931 GMC model T95 ?)
 G-29
 M1 Armored Car, (Cunningham) T4
 G-30
 T1E1 halftrack, 4½-Ton, (1933)
 G-31
 M1 scout car, T7, White Motor Company
 G-32
 M2 scout car, T9, Corbitt Company. Armored body by Diebold Safe & Lock Co.
 G-33
 T4 halftrack, 5-Ton, wire laying, GMC, (1934)
 G-34
 T5 halftrack, 6-Ton, GMC/ Cunningham
 G-35
 T11 armored car, 4-Ton, 4×4,
 T11E1
 T11E2

 G-36
 light tractor, 3½-Ton, Cletrac, model 20C
 G-37
 T3 Halftrack, 20½-Ton, Linn Mfg. Co.
 G-38
 M2 Light Tank
 M2A1
 M2A2
 M2A3
 Combat car, M1, M1A1
 G-39
 M2A2 light tank,
 G-40
 T3 Medium Tank, 12-Tons, U.S. Convertible Systems Inc.
 G-41
 T3E2 Medium tank, 16-Tons, U.S. Convertible Systems Inc.
 G-42
 T4 Medium tank, 12-Tons, U.S. Convertible Systems Inc.
 G-43
 T1 Combat car, 12-Tons, U.S. Convertible Systems Inc.
 G-45
 T3E3 light tractor, 3½-Ton
 T4E4
 G-46
 Ordnance tractor, 3½-Ton, Caterpillar Inc., model 25

 G-47
 M1 medium tractor, Caterpillar Inc., model 35
 G-48
 M1 medium tractor, Allis-Chalmers Monarch k35

 G-49
 M1 medium tractor, Cletrac model 35
 G-50
 Ordnance tractor, 5-ton, International Harvester, model TA40
 G-51
 Ordnance tractor, Allis-Chalmers Monarch k35
 G-52
 Ordnance tractor, 10-Ton, Caterpillar Inc., model 65
 G-53
 M1 heavy tractor, Allis-Chalmers
 G-54
 Ordnance tractor, Cletrac model 80
 G-55
 M1 Ordnance tractor, 3-ton, Allis-Chalmers
 G-56
 T20 Ordnance tractor, International Harvester
 G-57

 truck, 1½-3-Ton, ordnance maintenance, General Motors
 M3 machine shop
 M4 machine shop
 G-58
 truck, 1½-3-Ton, ordnance maintenance, General Motors
 M2 tool and bench
 G-59
 truck, 1½-3-Ton, ordnance maintenance, General Motors
 M2 welding
 M3 welding
 G-60
 T2 squad car White armored car
 G-61
 Truck, emergency repair, M1 (½-ton, 4×4, Telephone Company body), Dodge WC-41
 Truck, emergency repair, M2 (¾-ton, 4×4), Dodge WC-60
 G-62
 Truck, heavy machine shop
 G-63
 M1 heavy wrecker truck, Corbitt
 G-64
 M1 tractor crane, 1-Ton, Allis-Chalmers model M
 G-65
 B1A Bomb trailer,

 G-66
 M4 Scout car
 G-67
 M3 Scout Car, M3A1

 G-68
 M2 light tractor, Caterpillar Inc., Model R-2

 G-69
 M1 medium tractor, Caterpillar Inc. model RD-6 Caterpillar D6
 M3 tractor crane, 2-Ton, Caterpillar Inc. Model D-6
 G-70
 Tractor, Marmon-Herrington model TA-30
 G-71
 T6 light wheeled tractor
 G-72
 truck, 1½-3-Ton, ordnance maintenance, General Motors
 Truck, small arms repair, M1
 G-73
 T2 medium wrecking truck,
 G-74
 M5 Bomb Trailer low bed
 M1 chemical trailer, with trolly beam.
 M2 chemical trailer
 G-75
 T7 halftrack, White Motor (M2A2)
 G-76
 T1 armored car, command
 G-77
 T1 tank trainer
 G-78
 T2 combat car trainer

 G-79
 M2 mortar motor carriage, (scout car with M1-M2 4.2 inch mortar)
 G-80
 Carriage motor, mortar T5E1 motor carriage, (Halftrack M2A1 with M1-M2 4.2 inch mortar)
 G-81
 M2 Medium Tank, M2A1
 G-82
 truck, 1½-3-Ton, ordnance maintenance, General Motors
 M1 Artillery repair
 M2 Artillery repair
 G-83
 truck, 1½-3-Ton, ordnance maintenance, General Motors
 M1 Automotive repair
 M2 Automotive repair
 G-84
 truck, 1½-3-Ton, ordnance maintenance, General Motors
 M1 spare parts
 M2 spare parts

 G-85
 Bomb Service trucks
 V1 M1 Yellow Truck & Coach AC-25 (1942)
 V2 M1 Bomb service truck, 19-Y 1½-Ton, 4×4, Ford
 V3 M1 Diamond T, 201 3S
 V4 M6 Bomb service truck, 1½-Ton, 4×4, Chevrolet
 G-86
 M1 light tank
 M1A1
 M2A4

 G-87
 M2 halftrack truck (Ford/Marmon-Herrington, 1937)
 G-88
 M1 medium ordnance tractor, Caterpillar Inc. R-4 W/angle dozer
 G-89
 M1 heavy tractor, Caterpillar Inc. RD-7 Diesel, Caterpillar D7
 G-90
 M4 plotting room trailer
 G-91
 truck, 1½-3-Ton, ordnance maintenance, General Motors
 M1 tank maintenance
 G-92
 truck, 1½-3-Ton, ordnance maintenance, General Motors
 M1 instrument repair
 G-93
 T23E1 trailer, 1-Ton
 G-94
 M2 Tractor, Light, Wheeled, industrial type Allis-Chalmers Model B 
 G-95
 M1 medium tractor, model BC Cletrac, W/angle dozer

 G-96
 M2 light tractor model AG Cletrac Tractor Co.

 G-97
 trailer heavy-duty, 14-Ton Winter-Weiss Co.
 G-98
 M1 heavy tractor, Allis-Chalmers model HD10W

 G-99
 M5 tractor crane, 2-Ton,
 light tractor IH, TD9

G100 to G199
 G100
 T5 cross country carrier,

 G101
 M1 heavy tractor, International Harvester model TD18
 G102
 Half Tracks built by White Motor Co., Autocar, and Diamond T (at least 16 Volumes)
 Volume 1: Car, half-track, M2 M2 half-track car
 Volume 2: Car, half-track, M2A1
 Volume 3: Half-track M3
 Volume 4: Carrier, personnel, half-track, M3A1
 Volume 5: Carrier, 81-mm mortar, half-track, M4
 Volume 6: Carrier, 81-mm mortar, half-track, M4A1
 Volume 7: Carriage, motor, 57-mm gun, T48
 Volume 8: Carriage, motor, 75-mm gun, M3
 Volume 9: Carriage, motor, 75-mm gun, M3A1
 Volume 10: Carriage, motor, 75-mm howitzer, T30
 Volume 11: Carriage, motor, 105-mm howitzer, T19
 Volume 12: Carriage, motor, multiple gun, M13 (T1E4)
 Volume 13: Carriage, motor, multiple gun, M15 (T28E1).
 Volume 14: Half-track M16, Carriage, motor, multiple gun (Quadmount)
 Volume 15: Half-track M21 carrier 81-mm mortar
 Volume 16: Half-track M15A1 carriage motor gun
 G103
 Stuart light tank
 Volume 1: M3
 Volume 2: M5
 Volume 3: M5A1
 G104
 M4 Sherman (Contains 15 volumes)
 Volume 1: Tank, Medium M3
 Volume 2
 Volume 3: Tank Medium, M3A4
 Volume 4
 Volume 5: Tank Medium, M3A3
 Volume 6: Tank Medium, M4
 Volume 7: Tank Medium, M4A2 75-mm Gun
 Volume 8: Tank medium, M4A3 75-mm Gun (dry)
 Volume 9: Tank Medium, M4A4 75-mm Gun
 Volume 10: Tank Medium, M3A5
 Volume 11: Tank Medium, M4A1 75-mm Gun
 Volume 12: Tank Medium, M3A1, M3A2,
 Volume 13: Tank Medium, M4A6, 75-mm Gun
 Volume 14: Tank medium, M4, 105-mm Howitzer
 Volume 15: Tank Medium, M4A3, 105-mm Howitzer
 G105
 M1 Medium tractor, Allis-Chalmers model WM
 G106
 M1 Medium tractor, International Harvester model T6 W/angle dozer
 G107
 M1 heavy tractor, Allis-Chalmers model HD10W

 G108
 Tractor crane, 1-Ton, International Harvester model T6
 G109
 M1 Bomb service Truck, Ford, model 19F
 G110
 M1 Bomb service truck, Diamond T model 201-BS
 G111
 M2 High Speed Tractor, 7-Ton, model MG-1 Cletrac Tractor Co.
 G112
 M1 emergency repair, Fargo Dodge

 G113
 M2 light tractor, International Harvester model T6
 G115
 M6 Bomb service truck, Chevrolet
 G116
 Truck, 10-ton, 6x6, heavy wrecking M1
 M1 w/closed cab
 M1A1 w/open cab

 G117
 M6 trailer, 7-Ton, (T26), Fruehauf (for tractor cranes)
 M12 trailer, 9-ton
 G118
 M6 heavy tank
 G119
 T23E2 trailer, 6-Ton
 G120
 M5 Gun Motor Carriage, 3" Gun, Cletrac
 G121
 M6 Gun Motor Carriage (Fargo, Dodge WC-55)
 G122
 armored car T17E1, 4×4 Chevrolet
 G123
 tracked trailer, built by Athey Truss Wheel CO.
 6-Ton model BT898-1 general cargo
 6-Ton model BT898-4 general cargo
 20-Ton model ET1076-1 general cargo
 G124
 light tractor, Caterpillar Inc., model D-2
 G125
 M1 medium tractor, Allis-Chalmers

 G126
 M1 heavy tractor Caterpillar Inc. model D-7
 M4 tractor crane by Cardwell Crane Co.
 G127
 Howitzer Motor Carriage M8, for 75-mm howitzer.
 G128
 M7 Priest, gun motor carriage, 105-mm, American Locomotive Company
 G130
 M10 Tank Destroyer, 3" Gun, GMC Fisher Tank Division

 G132
 M1 medium tractor,
 M3 tractor crane, 2-Ton, International Harvester TD14
 G133
 T18 Boarhound, Yellow Coach
 T18E2 Armored car,
 G134
 T17 Deerhound Ford(M5 Deerhound)
 G135
 T13 Armoured car, REO
 G136
 M8 Greyhound

 G137
 M7 medium tank, International Harvester
 G138
 Ordnance Maintenance Truck, 2½-Ton, 6×6, GMC CCKW
 M7A1 2½-ton, 6 x 6, Small Arms Repair Truck
 M7A2 2½-ton, 6 x 6, Small Arms Repair Truck
 G139
 Ordnance Maintenance Truck, 2½-Ton, 6×6, GMC CCKW
 M8
 M8A1 Automotive Repair Truck
 G140
 Ordnance Maintenance Truck, 2½-Ton, 6×6, GMC CCKW
 M9
 M9A1 Artillery Repair Truck
 G141
 Ordnance Maintenance Truck, 2½-Ton, 6×6, GMC CCKW
 M10
 M10A1 instrument Repair Truck
 G142
 Ordnance Maintenance Truck, 2½-Ton, 6×6, GMC CCKW
 M12
 M12A1 Welding Truck
 G143
 Ordnance Maintenance Truck, 2½-Ton, 6×6, GMC CCKW
 M13 tool and bench truck
 G144
 Ordnance Maintenance Truck, 2½-Ton, 6×6, GMC CCKW
 M14 Spare Parts Truck
 G145
 Ordnance Maintenance Truck, 2½-Ton, 6×6, GMC CCKW
 M18 electric repair truck
 G146
 Ordnance Maintenance Truck, 2½-Ton, 6×6, GMC CCKW
 M16
 M16A1 Machine Shop Truck
 M16A2
 G147
 M5 halftrack, variant of M2 Half Track Car built by International Harvester 
 M5A1
 M9A1
 M14 multiple gun motor carriage, twin mount.
 M17 multiple gun motor carriage, Quadmount
 G148
 M22 Locust, (T9E1) light tank
 G149
 Ordnance Maintenance Truck, 2½-Ton, 6×6, GMC CCKW
 M18
 M18A1
 M18A2 Electric Repair Truck
 G150
 M4 Tractor high speed, 18-Ton Allis-Chalmers
 M4C
 G151
 light tractor, Caterpillar Inc. model D4, Caterpillar D4
 G152

 tractor, medium, Caterpillar Inc. model D6, Caterpillar D6
 G153
 tractor, heavy, Caterpillar Inc. model D8, Caterpillar D8
 G154
 M29 Weasel T-15 carrier, light cargo
 G155
 M4 plotting room trailer.
 G156
 Landing Vehicle Tracked MK-I, Food Machinery Corporation
 G157
 M8 Armored Trailer, John Deer Plow Works

 G158
 M30 cargo carrier, (T14), Pressed Steel Car Co.
 M12 Gun Motor Carriage
 G159
 M19 Tank Transporter, M20 truck (tractor) and M9 trailer combination, Diamond T tank transporter
 G160
 M25 Tank Transporter, M26 tractor and M15 trailer combination Paccar, Dragon Wagon
 G161
 M22 lift truck Weaver Mfg. Co.
 G162
 M5 Tractor, high speed, International Harvester
 M5A1
 G163
 M18 Hellcat motor carriage, 76-mm gun, (T70)
 M39 Armored Utility Vehicle, prime mover for 3-inch gun M6
 G164
 M10 tank gunnery trainer, 37-mm Gun,
 G165
 tank infantry, MK-III
 G166
 Universal Carrier T-16
 G167
 Landing Vehicle Tracked MK-II, Food Machinery Corporation
 G168
 Landing Vehicle Tracked MK-III, Food Machinery Corporation
 G169
 T2 tank recovery vehicle, Baldwin Locomotive Works
 G170
 M10A1 gun motor carriage, M10 Tank Destroyer Ford

 G171
 T16 Light Tank, Marmon-Herrington, model CTLS-4TAC
 G172
 M2 crane, truck mounted, and M16 trailer for clamshell.
 G173
 M12 Gunnery Trainer Tank, 75-mm Gun
 G174
 motor toboggan, Carl Eliason, model C. snowmobile Four Wheel Drive Co.
 G175
 Special tool combat vehicle
 G176
 M20 Armored Car, 6×6
 G177
 trailer, 5-Ton, ammo handling truck.
 G178
 Ordnance Maintenance Truck, 2½-Ton, 6×6, GMC CCKW
 M23 Instrument Bench Truck
 G179
 M29 Weasel
 G180
 T3 mine exploder
 G181
 light wheeled tractor, Case, model LA1
 G182
 kits, standard hardware, and shop supplies
 G183
 T23 Medium tank, T20 Medium Tank
 G184
 M6 Tractor High speed, 38-Ton, Allis-Chalmers
 G185
 M32 Tank Recovery Vehicle
 M32B1
 G186
 M32 Tank Recovery Vehicle
 M32B2
 G187
 M32A1 Tank Recovery Vehicle
 M32B3
 G188
 M32A1 Tank Recovery Vehicle
 M32B4
 G189
 M1 Bomb lift truck Weaver Mfg. co.
 G190
 M4E5 medium tank, Continental engine
 G191
 M4E5 medium tank, Ford engine
 G192
 motorized shop, truck, 1 1/2 ton 4x2, Type AAB,
 G193
 T10 Medium shop tractor (false name for searchlight equipped M3 medium tank), See Canal Defence Light
 G194
 M7 Snow Tractor, Allis-Chalmers
 G195
 M19 snow trailer, 1-Ton
 G196
 T10 medium tractor, Cletrac model MG-2
 G197
 T23E1 medium tank (Fisher)
 G198
 T26E1 heavy tank (Fisher)
 G199
 M7B1 gun motor carriage, 105-mm howitzer, Pressed Steel CarCo.

G200 to G299
 G200
 M24 Chaffee 75-mm M6 Gun
 G201
 M16 trailer, for clamshell scoop
 G202
 M31A1 tank recovery vehicle, M3A3 W/crane
 G203
 M31B2 tank recovery vehicle, M3A5 W/crane
 G204
 M4A3 Medium Tank, 75-mm Gun, Wet, GMC
 G205
 M4A3 Medium Tank, 76-mm Gun, Wet, Chrysler
 G206
 M4 Medium tank, 76-mm Gun, Wet,
 G207
 M4A1 Medium Tank, 76-mm Gun, Wet, Pressed Steel Car Co.
 G208
 Landing Vehicle Tracked MK-II, Armored, Food Machinery Corporation
 G209
 Landing Vehicle Tracked MK-IIII, Unarmored, Food Machinery Corporation
 G210
 M36 tank destroyer, Gun Motor Carriage, for 90-mm gun, (T71 )
 G212
 M4A2 Medium Tank, 76-mm Gun, Wet, GMC
 G213
 M21 Ammunition Trailer, Trailer Company of America
 G214
 Landing Vehicle Tracked MK-IIII, Armored, 75-mm Howitzer, Food Machinery Corporation.
 G215
 M34 Tank recovery vehicle, (M32B1)
 G216
 M23 Ammunition Trailer, 8-Ton, Utility Trailer Co.
 G217
 carriage, for M51 .50 cal MG.
 G218
 T1E1 Mine Exploder, (Sherman)
 G219
 T1E3 Mine Exploder, (Sherman)
 G220
 M20 trailer mount for Quadmount M45C, M55.

 G221
 M1 searchlight trailer, tilting bed,
 M7 Generator trailer
 M13 Director trailer, soft top, for gun data computer, and director
 M14 Director trailer, hard top, for gun data computer, and director
 M17 mount trailer, mount for Quadmount M45D, M51
 M18 trailer
 M22 director trailer, hard top,
 Trailer 2-Ton, With M7 smoke generator
 G222
 M33 tank recovery vehicle
 G223
 M35 Gun Motor Carriage, 3" Gun,
 G224
 T53 Bomb Trailer, 1-Ton Strick Co.
 G225
 M4A3E2 Medium Tank, Assault, 75-mm Gun, wet. GMC
 G226
 M26 Pershing tank
 G227
 shop van
 G228
 M1 bulldozer (M4 sherman) Blade By- La Plante Choate Mfg. Co.
 T5E3 Mine Excavator (Sherman)
 G229
 Ordnance Maintenance Truck, 2½-Ton, 6×6, GMC CCKW
 M31 signal corps general repair truck
 G230
 M4A1 medium tank, 75-mm Gun, wet,
 G231
 T36 snow tractor, 3-man, 7.500-Lbs, Iron Fireman Mfg. snow cruiser, (1944), 36 built.

 G232
 M40 Gun Motor Carriage, 155-mm Gun
 M43 Gun Motor Carriage, 8" Howitzer, Pressed Steel Car Co.
 G233
 M36B1 gun motor carriage, 90-mm, M36 tank destroyer,
 G234
 Ordnance Maintenance Truck, 2½-Ton, 6×6, GMC CCKW
 M32 tire repair truck, load-A, and Load-B.
 M25 Trailer, 1-Ton, Tire Repair, A-load generator, B-load tools.
 G235
 Ordnance Maintenance Truck, 2½-Ton, 6×6, GMC CCKW
 M30 signal corps general repair truck
 G236
 M41 Howitzer Motor Carriage, 155-mm Howitzer
 G237
 M36B2 Gun Motor Carriage, 90-mm, M36 tank destroyer,
 G238
 M37 Howitzer Motor Carriage, 105-mm Howitzer,
 G239
 T26E heavy tank, 105-mm Howitzer,
 G240
 M29 Bomb trailer 3/4-Ton payload American Bantam Car Co.
 G241
 tank medium, 75-mm Gun, wet,
 G242
 M19 Gun Motor Carriage, 40-mm Gun, Wet, MXWH
 G243
 T1E4 mine exploder,
 T1E6
 G244
 M46 Patton tank
 G245
 M76 Otter amphibious cargo carrier
 G246
 M3 tank dozer
 G247
 M2 bulldozer, M4A3 sherman
 G248
 M19 Gun Motor Carriage
 M19A1 GMC - Gun Motor Carriage, Dual 40-mm M2A1 guns,
 G249
 winterization kits (at least 54 volumes)
 Vol. 1, personnel heaters, Stewart-Warner
 Vol. 2, Engine heaters, Perfection
 Vol. 3, Winterization Kit for cold starting aid, (slave kit) M40.
 Vol. 4, MB/GPW's
 Vol. 5, 3/4-ton WC's and 1½-ton WC's. DEC-1954
 Vol. 6, GMC-CCKW
 Vol. 7, M-29 Weasel
 Vol. 8, truck 2.5-ton, 6×6, cargo, COE, GMC-AFKWX353, (G-508)
 Vol. 9, M38 jeeps
 Vol. 10, M37, 3/4 ton trucks
 Vol. 11, Chevrolet 1½-ton, 4×4
 Vol. 12, truck 2.5-ton, M34, and M35
 Vol. 13, Winterization Equipment for Truck 2.5-Ton, 6×6, M135 series.
 G250
 deep water fording kits
 G251
 M41 Walker Bulldog Cadillac
 G252
 M8 Tractor
 M8A1 high speed tractor with bulldozer,
 G253
 M42 Duster 40-mm
 G254
 T48 Tank 90-mm Gun, M48 Patton
 G255
 T42 Tank 90-mm Gun,
 G256
 T43 Tank, 120-mm Gun,
 G257
 T99 Gun Motor Carriage, 155-mm howitzer,
 G258
 T98E1 Gun Motor Carriage, 105-mm Gun
 G259
 T97 Gun Motor Carriage, 155-mm Gun,
 M53 155-mm Self-Propelled Gun
 G260
 T18E1 apc full track, M75 (APC)
 G261
 M55 Self Propelled Howitzer T108 Gun Motor Carriage, 8" Howitzer (see G259)
 G262
 M47 Patton tank
 G263
 T17 Tank trainer, 76-mm Gun
 G264
 T18 Tank trainer, 90-mm Gun
 G265
 M4 tank bulldozer
 G266
 M8 Tractor
 T8E4 bulldozer tractor
 G268
 M249 Truck, 4×4, Gun lifting,
 G269
 T39E1 combat engineer vehicle
 G270
 T44 Cargo Tractor
 G271
 T4E1 Wrecker, high speed tractor,
 G272
 T6 Wrecker, high speed tractor,
 G273
 T44 cargo tractor
 G274
 M51-T51 Tank recovery vehicle
 G275
 M3E1 tank bulldozer
 G276
 T16 Tank bulldozer
 G277
 LVTA6 LVT-5
 G278
 T18E1 tank bulldozer
 G279
 M44 self-propelled howitzer, 155-mm howitzer
 G280
 M59 (APC)
 M59-T74 tank recovery Vehicle
 G281
 M74 Tank Recovery Vehicle, Medium, (Sherman)
 G284
 tank dozer t-18
 G285
 M20 tank gunnery trainer, 90-mm gun
 G286
 M6 tankdozer, (on M47 tank)
 G287
 M48A2 tank
 M26 trainer
 M67A1 flame thrower
 G288
 M50 Ontos tank
 G289
 M56 Scorpion tank
 G291
 M8A1 tankdozer, (on M48A2 tank)
 G292
 M60 Patton tank
 G293
 M501 loader for Hawk missile
 G294
 M113 Armored Personnel Carrier
 G295
 M107 Self-Propelled Gun
 G296
 M108 Self-Propelled Gun M108 Howitzer
 M109 Self Propelled Gun M109 howitzer
 G298
 M88 Recovery Vehicle
 G299
 M116 cargo carrier, tracked, Husky

G300 to G500
Note, these are largely unused, or unknown.
 G300
 M114 carrier, command and reconnaissance, Cadillac
 G301
 M60A1 Armoured vehicle-launched bridge
 G302
 Unknown
 G303
 M728 Combat Engineer Vehicle
 G304
 Unknown
 G305
 M48A3 tank 90-mm gun,
 G306
 M9 tankdozer, (M60 tank)
 G307
 M17 tank trainer, 76-mm gun, (M41)
 G308
 Unknown
 G309
 M578 Light Recovery Vehicle
 G310
 M551 Sheridan
 G311
 M4 simulator, tank gunfire
 G312
 M113 Armored Personnel Carrier
 G314
 M8A2 tankdozer, (M48 tank)
 G315
 M104, self-propelled Howitzer, 105-mm,
 G316
 M67A2 tank, flame thrower, (M48 tank)
 G317 to G335 Unknown
 G336
 M60A1E2 152-mm gun, launcher,
 G337 to G352 Unknown
 G353
 M759 carrier, cargo,
 G354
 Unknown
 G355
 M48A4 tank, 105-mm gun,
 G356 to G389 Unknown
 G390
 M667 carrier, guided missile, (lance)
 G391
 Unknown
 G392
 M706 armored car,
 G393
 M727 carrier, guided missile, (Hawk)
 G394
 M730 carrier, guided missile, (Chaparral)
 G395
 M606 truck, 1/4-ton, utility,
 G396
 M729 tank,
 G397 to G399 unknown

G500 to G599
 G501
 Truck, 2-ton, 6×6, amphibian, GMC Model DUKW-353
 G502
 Truck, ¾ ton, 4×4 Dodge
 Truck, ambulance, ¾ ton, 4×4, Dodge WC54
 Truck, carryall, ¾ ton, 4×4, Dodge WC-53
 Truck, command reconnaissance, ¾ ton, 4×4 WC-56, WC-57, WC-58
 Truck, weapons carrier, ¾ ton, 4×4, Dodge WC-51, Dodge WC-52
 Truck, maintenance, utility, light, Dodge WC-60
 Truck, telephone and light maintenance K-50 truck, K-50B truck
 G503
 Truck, -ton, 4×4, Command Reconnaissance – Willys MB and Ford GPW, (now generally known as the WW II jeep)
 G504
 Truck, -ton, 4×4, amphibian, Ford GPA
 G505
 Truck, ½ ton, 4×4 Dodge
 Model VC-1 to VC-6
 Model WC-1, WC-3 to WC-27
 Model WC-40 to WC-43
 G506
 Truck, 1½-Ton, 4×4 (Chevrolet)
 Model G7103 Book Symbol NE – Cab
 Model G7113 Book Symbol NE – Cab (Tractor)
 Model G7105 Book Symbol NG – Panel Body, see also K-51 truck
 Model G7106 Book Symbol NH – Dump Body, Less Winch
 Model G7116 Book Symbol NL – Dump Body, With Winch
 Model G7107 Book Symbol NJ – Cargo Body, Less Winch
 Model G7117 Book Symbol NM – Cargo Body, With Winch
 Model G7163 Book Symbol NR – Telephone Body, With Earth Borer, see also K-44 truck
 Model G7173 Book Symbol NS – Telephone Maintenance Body, see also K-43 truck
 Model – Stake and Platform COE, K-33 truck
 Model – Stake and Platform COE, K-54 truck
 E5 Turret Trainer
 J3 field lighting truck
 J4 field lighting truck
 J5 field lighting truck
 fire truck, class 135, fog and foam,
 G507
 Truck, 1½ ton, 6×6, personnel and cargo (Dodge)
 Model WC-62 and WC-63 or T223
 G508
 Truck, 2½-ton, 6×6, GMC CCKW
 CCKW 352 Chassis (SWB)
 CCKW 353 Chassis (LWB)
 M1 Van, Chemical service
 M7 Van, small arms repair
 M8 Van, auto repair
 M9 Van, artillery repair
 M10 Van, instrument repair
 M12 Van, welding
 M13 Van, tool and bench
 M14 Van, spare parts
 M16 Van, machine shop
 M18 Van, electrical repair
 M23 Van, Instrument bench
 M27/27B1 Bomb service
 M30 Signal corps repair
 M32 Tire repair
 Cargo (SWB)
 Cargo (LWB)
 Dump
 Engineer
 Air compressor
 Earth boring
 Pontoon bolster
 Fuel tanker
 Fuel service (tanker w/pumps)
 Water tanker
 Water purification
 Stock rack (for cavalry horses)
 Class 530 Fire pumper
 Van (Dental operating)
 Van (Kitchen)
 Van (others, 17 versions total)
 G509
Truck, 4-ton, 6×6, Diamond T
 Prime mover cargo
 Ponton cargo
 Dump
 Wrecker
 Swinging boom crane
 Water distributor, 
 Flatbed with rear winch,
 Asphalt distributor, 
 Reproduction Equipment, Press Section,
 Tractor
 V-8 prime mover, with two PE-127 generators, for AN/MPN-1
 V-10 prime mover, with two PE-127 generators, for AN/MPN-1A
 V-11 prime mover, with two PE-127 generators, for AN/MPN-1B

 G510
 Truck, 4- to 5-ton, 4×4, COE  tractor, Autocar U7144T
 G511
 Truck, 5-6-ton, 4x4, Autocar U8144T
 COE  Ponton tractor
 K-30 truck, K-31 truck, K-62 truck, van type for SCR-270
 G512
 Truck, 6-ton, 6×6, prime mover, Corbitt
 G513
 Truck, 4- to 5-Ton, 4×4, Federal Motor Truck
 COE  tractor
 COE K-32 radio van
 G514
 Truck, 6-ton, 6×6, prime mover, White Motor Co.
 K-56 truck, SCR-268, and SCR-545 van type
 G515
 trailer, 1/2-Ton, cargo, van, Miller
 G516
 Trailer, 1/2 ton payload, 4 wheel, tandem axle, mobile command post, (miller CP-1)
 G517
 Trailer, 1-Ton, Mobile Communication, K-19 trailer
 G518
 Trailer, 1-Ton, 2-wheel, cargo, Ben-Hur MFG. CO. et al.
 K-52 trailer
 K-63 trailer
 K-63B trailer
 M24 ammunition trailer
 M25 trailer, tire repair, (load-A, and B)
 V-15 trailer, for AN/TPQ-2, Antenna mount.
 G519
 Bicycle, military, universal
 Bicycle, military, women's, M306
 G520
 15 passenger bus, converted type, Chevrolet, (limousine type)
 5 passenger car, 4×2, Light sedan Chevrolet
 G521
 5 passenger car, 4×2 light sedan, Plymouth
 G522
 5 passenger car, 4×2 light sedan, Ford
 G523
 Motorcycle model, Harley-Davidson WLA also ELA
 G524
 Motorcycle model 640-B, Indian (motorcycle) Co. also 340
 G525
 Semitrailer, 6-Ton Highway trailer Co.
 G526
 Truck, 6-ton, 6x6, prime mover, White Motor Co.
 G527
 Trailer, 1-Ton, 2-wheel, 250 Gallon water tank ("Water buffalo")
 G528
 Truck, 10-Ton, 6×4, Mack NR
 G529
 trailer 1/4-Ton, cargo, Amphibian, (jeep trailer) 
 K-38A trailer telephone cable splicer
 G530
 Semitrailer, 3½-Ton, Combination Stake and Platform,
 G531
 Truck, 4-ton, 4×4, Cargo, Four Wheel Drive Co. model HAR-1
 G532
 Truck, 7½-ton, 6×6, prime mover, Mack NO
 G533
 Truck, 5-Ton, 4×2, Mack Truck
 G534
 Semitrailer, 6-Ton, Textile Repair, Carter Mfg. Co.
 G535
 Truck, 6-ton, 6×6, prime mover, Mack NM
 G536
 Truck, 5-ton tractor, Autocar Company
 G537
 trailer, 6-ton, cargo, Hobbs
 G538
 semitrailer, 6-Ton, laundry, Lufkin
 G539
 Truck, 2½-Ton, 4×2 Federal Motor Truck Co.
 Dump Truck,
 Telephone Maintenance, Diamond T
 G540
 Truck, 1½-Ton, 4×2, Ford,
 combination stake, and platform
 dump
 Fire Truck, High pressure Fog/foam
 Fire Truck, Pumper, 500 GPM,
 Tractor,
 G541
 Dump Truck, 2½-Ton, 4×2, International Harvester
 G542
 Truck, 5-Ton, 4×2, International Harvester
 G543
 trailer, 1-Ton, cargo, American Bantam
 G544
 Semitrailer, 7-Ton, Combination Stake and Platform, Edwards Iron Works
 G545
 Semitrailer, 6-Ton, Van,
 G546
 Semitrailer, 7-Ton, Combination Stake and Platform, W. C. Nabors Co.
 G547
 Truck, 6-ton, 6×6, Bridge erector, Brockway Motor Co.
 Fire Truck, High pressure Fog/Foam,
 G548
 Metropolitan Ambulance 3/4-Ton, 4×2, Packard
 G549
 Metropolitan Ambulance 3/4-Ton, 4×2, Cadillac
 G550
 station wagon, 5-passenger, 4×2, Pontiac
 G551
 Motor Scooter with Package carrier, Cushman model 39
 G552
 Truck, Amphibious, 3/4-Ton, 4×4, XAC-3, Aqua Cheetah, Amphibious Car Co. (upgrade of G614)
 G553
 Truck Ordnance maintenance, 1⅓-3-Ton, 4×4, GMC
 G554
 Truck, 2½-Ton, 4×2, Diamond T
 Telephone Maintenance
 Cargo
 Dump
 G555
 Truck, dump, 5-Ton, 4×2, Federal
 G556
 Truck, 8-Ton, 6×4, Corbitt
 Tractor
 G557
 Truck, 10-ton, dump, Mack truck
 G558
 Semitrailer, gas tanker, 2,000 Gal. Freuhauf
 G559
 Semitrailer, 2-ton, shoe repair, Gerstenslager, and K55 (Miller)
 G560
 Semitrailer, 3½-Ton, Combination Stake and Platform, Checker
 G561
 semitrailer, 3-Ton, van, Gramm model DF-40
 G562
 semitrailer, 3½-Ton, Combination Stake and Platform, Checker model C-4
 G563
 semitrailer, 3½-Ton, Combination Stake and Platform, Dorsey model D-S
 G564
 Semitrailer, 3½-Ton, Combination Stake and Platform, Hobbs, model 5-DF
 G565
 Semitrailer, 6-Ton, Combination Stake and Platform, Kingham Trailer Co. Model H-308
 G566
 semitrailer, 3-Ton,
 G567
 Semitrailer, 3½-Ton, Combination Stake and Platform, Utility Trailer Manufacturing Company
 G568
 Semitrailer, 6-Ton, Combination Stake and Platform, Winter-Wiess
 G569
 Semitrailer, shoe repair, 6-Ton, Gerstenslager
 G570
 semitrailer, 3-Ton, Van, Carolina
 G571
 semitrailer, 3-Ton, Van, Steel products
 G572
 semitrailer, 7-Ton, cargo, Highway trailer Co.
 G573
 semitrailer, 6-Ton, Clothing repair van, Rivers
 G574
 semitrailer, 5-Ton, wheel pole, Dorsey
 G575
 Semitrailer, 3-Ton, Refer, American body
 G576
 semitrailer, 5-Ton, House, K-55 trailer,
 G577
 Semitrailer, 5-Ton, Refer, Trailer Co. of America
 G578
 Semitrailer, 8-Ton, Combination Stake and Platform, Mack Truck
 G579
 semitrailer, 3-Ton, Van, Highway trailer Co.
 G580
 Semitrailer, 6-Ton, Combination Animal and Cargo. Gramm
 G582
 Semitrailer, 3½-Ton, Combination Stake and Platform,
 G581
 Semitrailer, 10-Ton, Combination Stake and Platform, Fruehauf trailer
 G582
 Semitrailer, 3½-Ton, Combination Stake and Platform, Strick
 G583
 semitrailer, 6-Ton, Map reproducing van, Travelcar
 G584
 Semitrailer, 6-Ton, Laundry, Gramm Motor and Trailer Co.
 G585
 Motorcycle solo, Harley Davidson (shaft Drive), Harley-Davidson XA
 G586
 Semitrailer, 10-Ton, Textile Repair van, Gramm Motor and Trailer Co.
 G587
 Semitrailer, 6-Ton, 2-wheel, Textile Repair van, (10-ton gross), 1942 (Kentucky 4QB) 
 G588
 Semitrailer, 6-Ton, 2-wheel, Textile Repair/cargo van, (10-ton gross), 1942 Utility Trailer Manufacturing Company 
 G589
 Semitrailer, 6-Ton, 2-wheel, Sterilizer and Bath van, 1942 (Hyde 22-S) 
 G590
 Semitrailer, 6-Ton, 2-wheel, Sterilizer and Bath, (10-ton gross), 1942 (Strick 400) 
 G591
 Semitrailer, 6-Ton, 2-wheel, Sterilization & Bath, laundry, clothing, shoe and textile repair, (10-ton gross), 1942–43 – Timpte T-8 or Rivers Body et al. 
 G592
 Semitrailer, 6-Ton, Mobile Records Van,
 G593
 Semitrailer, 10-ton gross, 2-wheel, van, 1942, Gentry 
 G594
 Semitrailer, 10-Ton, van, Highway Trailer Co.
 G595
 Semitrailer, 7-Ton, panal cargo, Gramm Motor and Trailer Co.
 G596
 Semitrailer, 7-Ton, Cargo, Highway Trailer Co.
 G597
 Semitrailer, 7-Ton, Cargo, Carter
 G598
 Semitrailer, 7-Ton, Cargo, Whitehead
 G599
 Semitrailer, 11-Ton, Refer, Hyde model KR-20

G600 to G699
 G600
 Semitrailer, 7½-Ton, Low Platform,
 G601
 Semitrailer, 10-Ton, stake, Fruehauf trailer co.
 G602
 Semitrailer, 10-Ton, low bed, Highway trailer Co.
 G603
 Semitrailer, 12½-Ton, van, Fruehauf trailer co.
 G604
 Semitrailer, 22½-Ton, Low Platform, Trailer Co. of America
 G605
 trailer 1/2-Ton, public address van.
 G606
 2-Horse Trailer, 1-Ton, van,
 G607
 trailer, 4-Ton, van, Superior
 G608
 trailer, 5-Ton, refer, low bed, American body
 G609
 trailer, 5-Ton, van, Corbitt
 G610
 trailer, 20-Ton, platform, Jahn
 G611
 MO-PED, Airborne, Simplex
 G612
 1/2-Ton, Chevrolet, 4×2, Model BD-1001 up
 model carryall
 model pickup
 model canopy express
 G613
 Truck, -ton, 4 × 2, Dodge
 Model WC-36 to WC-39 (T-112)
 Model WC-47 to WC-50 (T-112)
 G614
 Truck, 1/2-Ton, 4×4, XAC-2, Amphibious, Aqua cheetah, Amphibian Car Corp.
 G615
 truck, 1/2-Ton, 4×2 Ford
 model pickup
 G616
 truck, 3/4-Ton, 4×2, Chevrolet
 panel delivery
 pickup
 G617
 Truck, 1½-Ton, 4×2, semi-tractor, Chevrolet
 light maintenance, and installation: 1/2-ton K-50 truck
 combination stake and platform
 cargo
 canopy express
 dump
 pickup
 Fire Truck, Brush
 Tractor
 G618
 Truck, -ton, 4x2, Dodge
 VF-31 (T-98), cargo 
 WF-31 (T-118), closed cab chassis 
 WF-31 (T-118), tractor 
 WF-32 (T-118), cargo 
 Fire truck, pumper, class 325, Equipment by W.S. Darley Corp.
 Fire truck, pumper, class 525, Equipment by Hahn Motor Truck co.
 G619
 Truck, 1½-Ton, 4×4, Ford
 G620
 Truck 1½-Ton, 4×2, GMC, Yellow Coach
 (LC), COE, K-18 truck, Model No. CF-351
 G621
 Truck, -ton, 4×4 Dodge
 VF-401, closed cab, cargo
 VF-402, closed cab, cargo, with winch
 VF-403, closed cab, dump
 VF-404, closed cab, cargo
 VF-405, closed cab, cargo, with winch
 VF-406, closed cab, dump
 VF-407, Ambulance
 G622
 Truck, -ton, 4×4, cargo, Ford Motor Company Ford GTB or MK-I
 GTB Truck Cargo (Box Bed) 1 1-2T 4×4 w Rear Duals
 GTBA Truck Cargo (Box Bed) 1 1-2T 4×4 w Rear Duals
 GTBB Truck Wrecker w Hoist Boom 1 1-2T 4×4 w Rear Duals
 GTBS Truck Bomb Service 1T 4×4 w Single Rear Tires
 GTBC Truck Bomb Service 1 1-2T 4×4 w Rear Dual
 G623
 Truck, -Ton, 4×2, cargo, GMC
 G624
 Dump Truck, -Ton Mack Truck
 G625
 Truck, -Ton, 4×2, REO
 G626
 Truck, -Ton, 4x4, C.O.E., Autocar 
 U-2044, oil service tanker, 1940–41
 U-4044, oil service tanker, 1940–41
 U-4144, oil service tanker, 1941
 U-4044-T, tractor, 1940-41 
 U-4144-T, tractor, 1941
 G627
 Truck, -Ton, Tractor, GMC
 G628
 Searchlight Truck -Ton, 6×4, COE, GMC model AFWX-354
 G629
 Searchlight Truck -Ton, 6×4, Mack Truck
 G630
 Truck, -Ton, 6×6, 5-ton, 6x4, Studebaker US6
 U1 Cargo (SWB w/o winch)
 U2 Cargo (SWB w winch)
 U3 Cargo (LWB w/o winch)
 U4 Cargo (LWB w winch)
 U5 Tanker (750 gallon)
 U6 Semi-tractor (6x4)
 U7 Cargo (6x4 w/o winch)
 U8 Cargo (6x4 w winch)
 U9 Cab and chassis (LWB w/o winch)
 U10 Dump (rear dump w/o winch)
 U11 Dump (rear dump w winch)
 U12 Dump (side dump w/o winch)
 U13 Dump (side dump w winch)
 G631
 Motorcycle solo, 45 cid, V-2, Shaft drive Indian, model Indian 841
 G632
 Truck, 4-Ton, 4×4, Van, AFX-804, GMC
 G633
 Truck, 4-Ton, Wrecker, White Motor Co. Model 950-X-6
 G634
 Truck, 5-Ton, 4×2, dump, Autocar
 G635
 Truck, 5-Ton, 4×4, COE  Tractor, Autocar U5044-T
 G636
 Truck, 5-Ton, GMC, CCW-353
 G637
 Truck, 5-Ton, cargo, International Harvester
 G638
 Truck, 5-6-Ton, 4×4, COE, Four Wheel Drive Co.
 G639
 Truck, 5-6-Ton, 4×4, COE tractor, Mack NJU
 G640
 Truck, 6-Ton, 4×2, Dump, Diesel, Mack Truck
 G641
 Truck, 7½-Ton, 6×6, Tractor, Minneapolis-Moline
 G642
 Truck 10-Ton, 6×4, cargo, White Motor
 G643
 Truck, 7½-Ton, 6×6, cargo, HUG
 G644
 5-passenger sedan, 4×2, medium, Packard
 G645
 Truck, 20 Ton, 6×4, Diesel, REO 28X
 G646
 Truck, 1/2-Ton, 4×2, GMC AC-101
 carryall
 pickup
 G647
 Truck, 5-Ton, 4×2, Dump, GMC
 G648
 Tractor Truck, 20-Ton, 6×6, (Diesel) Federal Motor Truck Co.
 G649
 Truck, 5-6 Ton, 4×4, Timber hauler, COE, Four Wheel Drive Co.
 G650
 Fire Truck, 4×2, pumper, Mack Truck
 G651
 Truck, 2½-Ton, 6×6, International M-5H-6
 Cargo
 Dump
 Pipeline
 Tanker
 Telephone
 Fire
 G652
 Truck, 5-Ton, 6×4, Wrecker, Mack Truck
 G653
 Autocar master parts list
 G654
 Chevrolet master parts list
 G655
 GMC master parts list
 G656
 Studebaker master parts list
 G657
 Dodge master parts list
 G658
 Ford master parts list
 G659
 International Harvester master parts list
 G660
 M10 ammunition trailer, Fruehauf trailer co.
 G661
 Trailer, 7-Ton, K-72 trailer, Van
 G662
 cart, jungle, 2-wheel Miller
 G663
 Semitrailer, 6½-Ton, pipe, Fruehauf trailer co.
 G664
 Semitrailer, 6-Ton, Shoe Repair, Gerstenslager Co.
 G665
 Semitrailer, 6-Ton, Clothing Repair, Rivers Body Factory
 Semitrailer, 6-Ton, Textile Repair, Carter Mfg. Co.
 Semitrailer, 6-Ton, Van,
 G666
 Truck, 12-Ton, COE, stake, GMC,
 G667
 Semitrailer, 12-Ton, flat bed, Fruehauf trailer co.
 G668
 Semitrailer, 12-Ton, flat bed, Steel Products
 G669
 Truck, 6-Ton, 6×6, cargo, White Motor Co. model 666-LMB
 G670
 Truck, 4-Ton, 6×6. Dump, REO,
 G671
 Truck 5-Ton, 4×2, International Harvester
 M425 Tractor, COE,
 M426 Tractor, COE,
 G672
 Motor scooter, 3-wheel, Cushman model 39
 G673
 Motorcycle, chain drive, Indian
 G674
 Motorcycle, chain drive, Indian
 G675
 Semitrailer, 5-Ton, Combination Stake and Platform,
 G676
 M365 Dolly, 10-Ton, Trailer converter, Fruehauf trailer co.
 Semitrailer, 10-Ton, Combination Stake and Platform,
 G677
 Semitrailer, 11-Ton, 28' Van
 G678
 F2B Semitrailer, 2,000 Gal. Fuel Servicing, HeilCo.
 G679
 motor scooter, W/sidecar, Cushman, model 34
 G680
 motorcycle, Harley Davidson, model 40-UA
 G681
 Semitrailer, 11-Ton, 28', Van, Trailer Co. of America
 G682
 Semitrailer, 11-Ton, 28', Van, Black Diamond
 G683
 Motor Scooter, Airborne, Cushman Motor works model 53
 G684
 Truck, 4-Ton, 4×4, with shovel crane, by Quick-Way truck shovel Co.
 G685
 trailer 1/4-Ton, K-38 trailer telephone cable splicer.
 G686
 trailer 2-Ton, K-36 trailer pole, and cargo
 G687
 trailer 5-Ton, K-37 trailer pole, and cable hauler.
 G688
 29 passenger bus, 4×2, international Harvester, model K5, KS5
 G690
 Truck, 6-Ton, 6×6, Bridge erector, Brockway
 G691
 Truck, 4-5-Ton, 4×4, White Motor Co.
 Tractor, COE 
 G692
 Truck, 7½-Ton, 6×6, Federal C-2
 Tractor
 Wrecker
 Crane
 G693
 Trailer, 3/4-Ton, pole hauller, York-Hoover
 G695
 dolly, trailer converter, K-83 dolly for K-78 trailer
 G696
 trailer 7-Ton K-28 trailer,(B and C), for SCR-268
 G697
 trailer 5-Ton K-34 trailer payload, SCR-268
 G698
 semitrailer 12-Ton K-78 trailer, SCR-584 van, and antenna
 G699
 trailer 1½ Ton, K-35 trailer, K-65 trailer, house, SCR-270

G700 to G799
 G700
 trailer 5-Ton K-76 trailer, K-77 trailer, for SCR-527
 G701
 semitrailer 6-Ton, K-67 trailer, SCR-547 antenna mount
 G702
 trailer 14-Ton, K-75 trailer, SCR-545 antenna, and cab.
 G703
 semitrailer 8-Ton, K-22 trailer, K-64 trailer, SCR-270, antenna mount.
 G704
 PG-45 Pigeon trailer, 1/2-Ton, Weston trailer Co.
 G705
 trailer 3-Ton, K-29 trailer for SCR-277
 G706
 Semitrailer 11-Ton, 28' van, general cargo.
 Semitrailer, 11-Ton, 28' Van
 G707
 semitrailer 6-Ton van, general cargo
 G708
 Dolly, light-duty, model DC-3
 G709
 Truck, 2½-Ton, 6×6, medical van,
 G710
 Trailer 20-Ton & 22-Ton, Low bed, Fruehauf Model CPT-20 & CPT-22 - Jahn Model LKD-620 Fruehauf trailer
 G711
 Signal Corps Van Bodies, K-53 truck
 G712
 Semitrailer, 11-Ton, 28' Van
 G713
 M26 semitrailer 7-Ton van, for gun computer M8N, and M8P
 semitrailer 15-Ton V-9 Trailer for AN/MPG-1 radar
 G714
 trailer 7-Ton, low bed, K-84 trailer, for SCR-784
 G715
 M13 Set, Dolly and Track,
 G716
 PE-95 power units, Milleys engine model 441
 G717
 Truck, 2½-Ton, 6×4, 10,000 Gal. water sprinkler, Studebaker US6x4
 G718
 Truck, 2½-Ton, 6×4, 1,350 Gal. gasoline, Studebaker US6x4
 G719
 Trailer, 5-Ton, cargo, Fruehauf trailer
 G720
 Trailer, 22-Ton, low bed, La Cross model DF 6C-22
 G721
 M1 Cargo Sled, 1-Ton
 G722
 Semitrailer, 6-Ton, V-9 trailer AN/MPG-1
 G723
 Semitrailer, 11-Ton, van, Fruehauf trailer model 228-L
 G724
 Trailer, 12-Ton, V-5 Trailer, For AN/MPN
 G725
 Truck, 4-Ton, 6×6, Torpedo, air corps, Diamond T
 G726
 M1 light motorcycle, Airborne, Indian,
 G727
 trailer 2½-Ton, Amphibian (used with DUKW) general cargo.
 G728
 trailer, 22-Ton, low bed, La Cross model DF 6T-22
 G729
 Trailer, 7½-Ton, 2,500 Gal. Gasoline,
 G730
 Semitrailer, 2½-Ton, stake and platform, W/dolly, Highway trailer Co.
 G731
 metropolitan ambulance, 1½-Ton, 4×2, Linn coach and truck
 G737
 M1A1 cargo sled, 1-Ton
 G738
 M14 cargo sled, 1-Ton
 G739
 M14A1 cargo sled, 1-Ton
 G740
 Willys M38 1/4 ton, truck, utility, 4×4,
 (Willys truck, station wagon, 1/4 ton, 4×4, models 463 and 473) 
 G741
 Dodge M37
 M42 command truck
 M43 ambulance
 V-41 truck, telephone maintenance, also (M201)
 V-126 truck, AN/MPX-7
 M152 enclosed utility truck
 G742
 Truck, 2½-Ton, 6×6, M34 series
 M34 Cargo (single rear tires)
 M35 Cargo (dual rear wheels)
 M36 Cargo (long wheelbase)
 M46 Mobil shop
 M47 Dump (single rear tires)
 M48 Semi-tractor
 M49 Fuel tanker
 M50 Water tanker
 M59 Dump (dual rear tires)
 M60 Light wrecker
 M108 Crane truck
 M109 Van truck (12-foot body)
 M275 Semi-tractor (short wheelbase)
 M292 Van truck (17-foot expansible body)
 M342 Dump (HD dump body)
 M387 Guided missile launcher
 M398 Guided missile launcher
 M756 Pipeline construction
 M764 Earth boring & pole setter
 Non-standard
 V17 Telephone construction and maintenance
 V18 Earth boring and pole setter
 Class 530A Tactical fire pumper
 210 Compressors (WDS Davey and G1 LeRoi)
 Water purification (1,500gph and 3,000gph)
 G743
 M104 cargo trailer, 1.5-ton
 M105 cargo trailer, 1.5-ton
 M106 water tank,
 G744
 Truck, 5-Ton, 6×6, M39 series
 M41 Truck, Cargo
 M51 Truck, Dump
 M52 Truck, Tractor
 M54 (truck), Cargo
 M55 Truck, Cargo, Extra Long Wheel Base (XLWB)
 M61 Truck, Chassis
 M62 Truck, Wrecker, Medium
 M63 Truck, Chassis
 M64 Truck, Cargo Van
 M139 Truck, Chassis
 M139 Truck, Bridging
 M246 Truck, Tractor, Wrecker
 M289 Truck, Missile Launcher
 M291 Truck, Van, Expansible
 M328 Truck, Bridging
 M386 Truck, Missile Launcher
 M543 Truck, Wrecker, Medium
 M748 Truck, Bolster
 G745
 Dolly 6-Ton, trailer converter, Heil Co.
 G746
 Dolly 10-Ton, trailer converter, Springfield auto
 G747
 M100 Trailer 1/4-Ton, Dunbar Kapple
 M367 trailer K-38B trailer
 G748
 M101 trailer, 3/4-Ton, cargo,
 M116 trailer chassis
 G749
 Truck, 2½-Ton, 6×6, GMC
 M135 Cargo (single rear tires)
 M211 Cargo (dual rear tires)
 M215 Dump (dual rear tires)
 M216 Dump (single rear tires, Canada only)
 M217 Gasoline tanker
 M220 Shop van
 M221 Semi-tractor
 M222 Water tanker
 G750
 M126 trailer chassis, 12-Ton Fruehauf trailer
 M127 Trailer, stake
 M128 van cargo
 M129 van supply
 M308 water tanker, 4000 Gal.
 G751
 semitrailer, 6-ton, 1 axle,
 M117
 M118 stake bed
 M119 cargo van
 M457 maintenance
 M458 maintenance
 M459 maintenance
 M508 shop van
 G754
 M102 Trailer, 1½-Ton, Fruehauf trailer
 M103 chassis
 M104 cargo
 M105 cargo
 M106 water tank
 M107 water tank
 M448 shop van
 G755
 M131 semitrailer, gasoline, 5000 Gal.
 G756
 M200 trailer, chassis 3-ton, 1-axle, generator,
 G758
 M38A1 truck 1/4-Ton, truck utility, Willys M38 Willys
 M170 front line ambulance
 G759
 Ambulances and Hearses
G760
 Automobiles, including station wagones
 G761
 Busses
 G762
 Motorcycles
 G763
 Trucks 1/4-ton
 G764
 Trucks 1/2 ton
 G765
 Trucks 3/4-ton
 G766
 Trucks 1-ton
 G767
 Trucks 1.1/2-ton
G768
 Trucks 2.1/2-ton
 G769
 Trucks 4-ton
 G770
 Trucks 5-ton
 G771
 Trucks 7-ton
 G772
 Semitrailers, 2- to 3.1/2-ton
 G773
 Semitrailers 5- to 6-ton
 G774
 Semitrailers, 10- to 11-ton
 G775
 Trailers 1-ton
 G776
 Trailers, 1.1/2-ton
 G777
 Trailers 2- and 2.1/2-ton
 G778
 Trailers, 3- and 3.1/2-ton
 G779
 Trailers, 5- and 6-ton
 G780
 power units, willys engine type, model CJ-3A.
 G781
 trailer, laundry, 2-wheel, 2-trailer,
 G782
 M271 trailer, 3.5 ton 1-axle, pole hauler
 V-13 trailer
 G783
 ambulance 3/4-ton, metropolitan, Cadillac 5186, (1952)
 G789
 M242 trailer, van radar dish mount, for M33 fire control system, Nike (rocket)
 M243 trailer, antenna hauler, for M33 fire control system, Nike (rocket)
 M244 trailer, van, computer, for M33 fire control system, Nike (rocket)
 M258 van, radar tracking central
 M259 van, guided missile directors trailer
 M260 low bed antenna mount
 M261 flat bed, guided missile
 M262 van, launch control station
 M359 van, electronic repair shop
 M382 van, electronic repair shop
 M383 van, electronic repair shop
 M406 low bed antenna mount
 M424 van, guided missile directors trailer
 M428 van, guided missile tracking station
 M564 van, shop
 M582 van, shop
 M583 van, shop
 G790
 M173 tank transporter, trailer, 25-ton
 G791
 M160 tank transporter, trailer, 60-ton
 G792
 Truck, 10-Ton, 6×6, M123 series
 M123 Semi-tractor
 M125 Cargo
 G793
 Sled, cargo, 2-ton, T-37
 G797
 M172 Semitrailer, Low Bed, 15-ton, 4-Wheel

G800 to G899
 G800
 M197 dolly, trailer converter, 6-ton
 M198 dolly, trailer converter, 6-ton
 G801
 truck, and sedan, Chevrolet, 1929 to 1952
 G802
 M269 semitrailer, low bed, 12-ton,
 M270 semitrailer, low bed, 12-ton,
 G803
 sedan, medium, Pontiac, 1935 to 1950
 G804
 truck, tractor, Diamond T, model 720
 G805
 truck, Dodge, series-B
 G806
 truck, Ford, series-F
 Bus, Ford, series-F
 G807
 truck, GMC, models 400 thru 980
 G808
 truck, GMC, Models 100-22 to 150-22
 G809
 truck, tractor, 5-ton, 4×2, white model WC22PLT
 G810
 sedan, light, Ford, 1949–1951
 G811
 M199 dolly, trailer converter, 18-ton,
 G812
 trucks, 10-ton, see G771
 G813
 M310 trailer 3½-Ton, cable reel, K37B trailer 1955
 G814
 XM147 super duck, 2.5-ton, 6×6, GMC
 G815
 M349 semitrailer, refer, 7.5-ton, 1-axel
 G816
 M345 trailer, platform, 10-ton,
 G817
 M278 trailer, water tank, 2000-Gal.
 G819
 M295 series semitrailers, 6-ton,
 M313 semitrailer, van, expansible,
 M447 semitrailer, van, shop,
 M749 semitrailer, van, repair parts, and shop equipment
 M750 semitrailer, van, parts storage,
 G820
 M349 semitrailer, refrigerator, 7.5-ton,
 G821
 M329 trailer, rocket transporter, Honest John
 G822
 M269 trailer, utility, 2.5-ton
 G823
 M274 truck platform, U.S. Military M274 Truck, Platform, Utility 1/2 Ton, 4X4 MULE
 G824
 M146 semitrailer, shop van, 6-ton,
 G833
 M33A1 semitrailer, trainer van, 3-ton
 M348 semitrailer, van electronics, V-189 trailer, for AN/MSC-25
 M373 semitrailer, van electronics,
 M394 semitrailer, van medical,
 XM1005 semitrailer, van electronic,
 XM1007 semitrailer, van electronic,
 G834
 M601 truck, cargo, 1-ton, 4×4, Dodge
 M615 ambulance
 G835
 M607 Truck, tractor, 2.5-ton
 M608 Truck, dump, 2.5-ton
 M609 Truck, shop van, 2.5-ton
 M610 Truck, water tank, 1000 Gal. 2.5-ton
 M611 Truck, gasoline tanker, 1200-Gal,
 M612 Truck, van expansible,
 M613 Truck, instrument repair shop,
 M614 Truck, dump,
 M616 Truck, chassis, 2.5-ton, 6×6,
 M617 Truck, chassis, 2.5-ton, 6×6,
 M618 Truck, chassis, 2.5-ton, 6×6,
 M619 Truck, chassis, 2.5-ton, 6×6,
 M620 Truck, chassis, 2.5-ton, 6×6,
 G838
 M151 1/4 Ton truck utility
 G839
 M390 trailer, chassis, 2-ton,
 M514 trailer, chassis, 1-ton,
 XM545 trailer, chassis, 1-ton,
 G840
 M389 trailer, chassis, 1-ton,
 G842
 M113 trailer, chassis, 3-ton
 M114 trailer, low bed, 3-ton,
 M455 trailer, low bed, 5-ton,
 M456 trailer, low bed, 5-ton,
 M460 trailer, van electronics, 5-ton,
 M461 trailer, van electronic, 5-ton,
 M518 trailer, transporter,
 M525 trailer, chassis, 5-ton,
 G843
 M422 Mighty Mite
 G845
 M604 truck, cargo, 3/4-ton, 4×4,
 G846
 M605 truck, cargo, 2.5-ton, 6×6,
 G847
 M603 truck, utility, 1/4-ton, 4×4,
 G648
 M348 semitrailer, van electronic, 6-ton,
 M373 semitrailer, van electronic,
 G849
 M454 trailer, chassis, 2.5-ton,

 G852
 truck, 5-ton, 8×8, Ford,
 M656 truck, cargo,
 M757 truck, tractor,
 M791 truck, expansible van,
 G854
 M353 trailer, 3.5-ton,
 G855
 M162 semitrailer, low bed, 60-ton,
 G856
 M347 semitrailer, refer, 15-ton,
 G857
 M416 trailer, 1/4-ton, 1 axle,
 M416A1
 M416B1
 M569 chassis, V-498 trailer for AN/TTC-41
 G858
 M529 trailer, low bed, 7-ton, Nike missile
 G859
 M527 semitrailer, low bed, 6-ton,
 M539 semitrailer, chassis,
 M539E2 semitrailer, van, field maint.
 M671 semitrailer, van, org. maint.
 M672 semitrailer, van, field maint.
 G860
 M437 truck, cargo, 16-ton, 4×4, Caterpillar
 M438 truck, fuel tank, 5,000-Gal,
 M554 truck, wrecker, 20-ton,
 G861
 M520 Goer, 8-ton, 4×4 Caterpillar
 M553 wrecker,
 M559 tanker, 2,500-Gal.
 M877 cargo,
 G863
 see G742.
 G865
 M555 semitrailer, electronics van, 6-ton,
 M556 semitrailer, electronics van, 6-ton,
 M557 semitrailer, electronics van, 10-ton,
 M558 semitrailer, electronics van, 10-ton,
 G867
 M536 trailer, laundry, 1.5-ton
 M537 trailer, bakery, 2.5-ton
 M538 trailer, dough mixer,
 M759 trailer, dough mixer,
 G868
 M523 truck, tractor, 25-ton, Kenworth
 G869
 M524 semitrailer, low bed, 55-ton, HETT
 G870
 M528 dolly, load divider, 35-ton,
 G871
 M463 trailer, air conditioner, 1.5-ton,
 G872
 M354 dolly, trailer converter, 15-ton,
 G874
 M561 Gama Goat
 G875
 M417 trailer, cargo, 1-ton,
 G877
 M149 trailer, water tank, 400-Gal.
 M625 trailer, water tank, 400-Gal,
 G879
 M571 carrier, utility, articulated, Canadair, Dynatrac,
 G881
 M580 trailer, chassis, 1-ton,
 M581 trailer, electronic van, 1.5-ton,
 G882
 M586 trailer, water tank, 2,000-Gal.
 M796 trailer, bolster, 4-ton,
 G883
 semitrailer, van 4-ton
 M574 semitrailer, electronic van,
 M654 semitrailer, electronic van, telemeter,
 M680 semitrailer,
 M738 semitrailer,
 M739 semitrailer, switchboard,
 M823 semitrailer,
 M824 semitrailer,
 G884
 M674 semitrailer, low bed, 15-ton,
 M682 semitrailer, radar transmitter van,
 M683 semitrailer, radar control,
 M684 semitrailer, heat exchanger,
 G888
 M131 semitrailer, fuel tank, 5,000-Gal.
 G889
 M689 dolly, transportable shelter,
 M690 dolly, front,
 M691 dolly, rear,
 M829 dolly, transportable shelter,
 M830 dolly, front,
 M831 dolly, rear,
 G890
 Truck, 1¼ ton, 4×4 (Kaiser Jeep)
 Kaiser Jeep M715
 M724 truck, chassis
 M725 truck, ambulance,
 M726 truck, telephone,
 G891
 trailer, flat bed, 10-ton,
 G892
 trailer, bolster, swivel, 14-ton
 G893
 trailer, flat bed, 7-ton,
 G894
 trailer, low bed, 60-ton,
 G895
 trailer, low bed, 8-ton,
 G896
 trailer, bolster,
 G897
 trailer, bolster, swivel, 9-ton,
 G898
 M720 dolly set, 3-ton, includes 721, and 722
 M721 dolly front,
 M722 dolly rear,

G900 to end
 G900
 truck, 2.5-ton, 6×6,
 M621 truck, cargo
 M622 truck, fuel tank, 1200-Gal.
 M623 truck, shop van,
 M624 truck, dump,
 G901
 truck, 2.5-ton, 6×6,
 M766 truck, chassis
 M767 truck, chassis
 M768 truck, chassis
 M769 truck, chassis
 M770 truck, cargo
 M771 truck, cargo
 M772 truck, cargo
 M773 truck, cargo
 M774 truck, cargo
 M775 truck, cargo
 M776 truck, tank
 M777 truck, chassis
 M778 truck, cargo, dropside
 M779 truck, tank fuel,
 M780 truck, water tank, 1000-Gal,
 M781 truck, shop van,
 M782 truck, Instrument repair shop,
 M783 truck, tractor,
 M784 truck, dump
 M785 truck, bolster
 M786 truck, pole construction,
 M787 truck, telephone maint.
 M788 truck, auger,
 G902
 M627 semitrailer, jointed, 52.5-ton, tank hauler, Ward LaFrance Truck Corporation
 M793 semitrailer, jointed, 52.5-ton, tank hauler
 G903
 M746 truck, tractor, 22.5-ton, tank transporter
 G904
 M747 semitrailer, low bed, 52.5-ton, tank transporter, Condec
 G905
 M705 truck, cargo, 5/4-ton, 4×4, Chevrolet
 M737 ambulance, 5/4-ton, 4×4
 G906
 M36A2C truck, cargo, 2.5-ton, 6×6
 G907
 M789 trailer, flat bed, tilt loading, 6-ton
 G908
 M809 truck, chassis, 5-ton, 6×6, A M General
 M810 truck, chassis (SWB)
 M811 truck, chassis (XLWB)
 M812 truck, chassis (XLWB)
 M813 truck, cargo (14-foot body)
 M814 truck, cargo (20-foot body)
 M815 truck bolster
 M816 truck, wrecker
 M817 truck, dump
 M818 truck, tractor
 M819 truck, tractor, wrecker
 M820 truck, expansible van
 M821 truck, stake, (bridge transport)
 G909
 dolly set, portable shelter
 G910-Nothing follows

See also 

List of U.S. Army weapons by supply catalog designation
List of U.S. Signal Corps Vehicles
List of U.S. military vehicles by model number
Federal Stock Number
NATO Stock Number
Tank classification

Footnotes

Reference notes

References, general

G503 Military Vehicle Message Forums
U.S. Govt. Publications, Monthly Catalog no. 582 (July '43) through no. 587 (December '43), Government Printing Office, Superintendent of Documents. Includes alphabetised Index for the whole of 1943.

ST 9-159 handbook of Ordnance material dated March 1968. (ST- is Special Text)

WD CAT. ORD 1 Introduction to ordnance catalog
WD CAT. ORD 2 Index to Ordnance supply catalog

External links
https://web.archive.org/web/20080302112911/http://www.transchool.eustis.army.mil/museum/museum.html
https://www.webcitation.org/5u7teKGad?url=http://mailer.fsu.edu/~akirk/tanks/UnitedStates/unarmored-halftracks/unarmored-half-tracks.html 
http://stampedout.net/odds-011-snl.html
https://archive.org/details/americasmunitio01deptgoog early vehicles
http://www.stugiii.com/images/US_Vehicle_Markings.pdf markings

 
Military vehicles by supply catalog designatio
Vehicles by supply catalog designation
 
Vehicles by supply catalog designation
Military vehicles by supply catalog designation
Vehicles